The Drugs Act 2005 (c 17) is an Act of the Parliament of the United Kingdom.

Section 24 - Short title, commencement and extent
The following orders have been made under section 24(3):
The Drugs Act 2005 (Commencement No. 1) Order 2005 (S.I. 2005/1650 (C. 68))
The Drugs Act 2005 (Commencement No. 2) Order 2005 (S.I. 2005/2223 (C. 93))
The Drugs Act 2005 (Commencement No. 3) Order 2005 (S.I. 2005/3053 (C. 128))
The Drugs Act 2005 (Commencement No. 4) Order 2006 (S.I. 2006/2136 (C. 71))
The Drugs Act 2005 (Commencement No. 5) Order 2007 (S.I. 2007/562 (C. 23))

References
Halsbury's Statutes,

External links
The Drugs Act 2005, as amended from the National Archives.
The Drugs Act 2005, as originally enacted from the National Archives.
Explanatory notes to the Drugs Act 2005.

United Kingdom Acts of Parliament 2005